Eduard Hanslick (11 September 18256 August 1904) was an Austrian music critic, aesthetician and historian. Among the leading critics of his time, he was the chief music critic of the Neue Freie Presse from 1864 until the end of his life. He was a conservative critic and championed absolute music over programmatic music for much of his career. As such, he sided with and promoted the faction of Robert Schumann and Johannes Brahms in the so-called "War of the Romantics", often deriding the works of composers such as Franz Liszt and Richard Wagner. His best known work, the 1854 treatise Vom Musikalisch-Schönen (On the Musically Beautiful), was a landmark in the aesthetics of music and outlines much of his artistic and philosophical beliefs on music.

Biography

Hanslick was born in Prague (then in the Austrian Empire), the son of Joseph Adolph Hanslik, a bibliographer and music teacher from a German-speaking family, and one of Hanslik's piano pupils, the daughter of a Jewish merchant from Vienna. At the age of eighteen Hanslick went to study music with Václav Tomášek, one of Prague's renowned musicians. He also studied law at Prague University and obtained a degree in that field, but his amateur study of music eventually led to writing music reviews for small town newspapers, then the Wiener Musik-Zeitung and eventually the Neue Freie Presse, where he was music critic until retirement. Whilst still a student, in 1845, he met with Richard Wagner in Marienbad; the composer, noting the young man's enthusiasm, invited him to Dresden to hear his opera Tannhäuser; here Hanslick also met with Robert Schumann.

In 1854 he published his influential book On the Beautiful in Music. By this time his interest in Wagner had begun to cool; he had written a disparaging review of the first Vienna production of Lohengrin. From this point on, Hanslick found his sympathies moving away from the so-called 'music of the Future' associated with Wagner and Franz Liszt, and more towards music he conceived as directly descending from the traditions of Mozart, Beethoven and Schumann — in particular the music of Johannes Brahms (who dedicated to him his set of waltzes opus 39 for piano duet). In 1869, in a revised edition of his essay Jewishness in Music, Wagner attacked Hanslick as 'of gracefully concealed Jewish origin', and asserted that his supposedly Jewish style of criticism was anti-German. It is sometimes claimed that Wagner caricatured Hanslick in his opera Die Meistersinger von Nürnberg as the carping critic Beckmesser (whose name was originally to be Veit Hanslich).

Hanslick's unpaid lectureship at the University of Vienna led in 1870 to a full professorship in history and aesthetic of music and later to a doctorate honoris causa. Hanslick often served on juries for musical competitions and held a post at the Austrian Ministry of Culture and fulfilled other administrative roles. He retired after writing his memoirs, but still wrote articles on the most important premieres of the day, up to his death in 1904 in Baden.

Views on music

Hanslick's tastes were conservative; in his memoirs he said that for him musical history really began with Mozart and culminated in Beethoven, Schumann and Brahms. He is best remembered today for his critical advocacy of Brahms as against the school of Wagner, an episode in 19th century music history sometimes called the War of the Romantics. The critic Richard Pohl, of the Neue Zeitschrift für Musik, represented the progressive composers of the "Music of the Future".

Being a close friend of Brahms from 1862, Hanslick possibly had some influence on Brahms's composing, often getting to hear new music before it was published. Hanslick saw Wagner's reliance on dramatics and word painting as inimical to the nature of music, which he thought to be expressive solely by virtue of its form, and not through any extra-musical associations. On the other hand, he referred to extra-musicality when he asked, "When you play Chopin's mazurkas, do you not feel the mournful and oppressive air of the Battle of Ostroleka?" (Hanslick 1848, p. 157). The theoretical framework of Hanslick's criticism is expounded in his book of 1854, Vom Musikalisch-Schönen (On the Beautiful in Music), which started as an attack on the Wagnerian aesthetic and established itself as an influential text, subsequently going through many editions and translations in several languages. Other targets for Hanslick's heavy criticism were Anton Bruckner and Hugo Wolf. Of Tchaikovsky's Violin Concerto, he accused both Tchaikovsky and the soloist, Adolph Brodsky, of putting the audience "through hell" with music "which stinks to the ear"; he was also lukewarm towards the same composer's Sixth Symphony.

Hanslick is noted as one of the first widely influential music critics. While his aesthetics and his criticism are typically considered separately, they are importantly connected. Hanslick was an outspoken opponent of the music of Liszt and Wagner, which broke down traditional musical forms as a means of communicating something extra-musical. His opposition to "the music of the future" is congruent with his aesthetics of music: the meaning of music is the form of music. It is along these lines that Hanslick became one of Brahms's champions and often pitted him against Wagner. For this reason, Brahms is often mistakenly positioned as being anti-Wagnerian himself, a historical interpretation that disregards Brahms's and Wagner's mutual admiration.

Vom Musikalisch-Schönen

First published in 1854, On the Musically Beautiful is often referred to as the foundation of modern musical aesthetics. As such claims are typically overstated, it is probably best to consider it the codification of such notions of musical autonomy and organicism. These ideas proliferated in academia, in which he was the first professor of music history and aesthetics. Importantly, while this text certainly lays the theoretical groundwork for musical formalism, formal analysis is something that Hanslick himself never did.

Chapter 1: Aesthetics as Founded on Feelings

This chapter critiques the standing aesthetics of music, which Hanslick refers to as the “aesthetics of feeling.” He cites the following authors to demonstrate “how deeply these doctrines [aesthetics of emotion] have taken root”: Mattheson, Neidthardt, J.N. Forkel, J. Mosel, C.F. Michaelis, Marpurg, W. Heinse, J.J. Engel, J.Ph. Kirnberger, Pierer, G. Schilling, Koch, A. André, Sulzer, J.W. Boehm, Gottfried Weber, F. Hand, Amadeus Autodidaktus, Fermo Bellini, Friedrich Thiersch, A. v. Dommer, and Richard Wagner. By ending his list of theorists with Wagner, he makes his primary critical target obvious; Wagner had recently published his own essay, Opera and Drama, in 1851, in which he demonstrates how his compositional technique expresses the feelings inherent in the content and form of poetry.
In contradistinction, Hanslick asserts the autonomy of music, writing, “The beautiful is and remains beautiful though it arouse no emotion whatever, and though there be no one to look at it. In other words, although the beautiful exists for the gratification of an observer, it is independent of him.”

Chapter 2: The Representation of Feelings is Not the Subject of Music

Hanslick posits that since emotion is not present in the music (objective) but is dependent on the listener's interpretation (subjective) it cannot be the basis for an aesthetics of music. He does admit, however, that music may “awaken feelings,” but maintains that it cannot “represent” them.

Chapter 3: The Beautiful in Music

Hanslick writes, “The essence of music is sound and motion” and suggests that the proper basis for an aesthetics of music are “sonically moving forms.” Furthermore, he suggests that these forms extend, or grow, from a freely conceived musical theme. He writes, 
 
“The initial force of a composition is the invention of some definite theme, and not the desire to describe a given emotion by musical means. Thanks to that primitive and mysterious power, whose mode of action will forever be hidden from us, a theme, a melody flashes on the composer’s mind. The origin of this first germ cannot be explained, but must simply be accepted as a fact. When once it has taken root in the composer’s imagination, it forthwith begins to grow and develop; the principal theme being the center round which the branches group themselves in all conceivable ways, though always unmistakably related to it. The beauty of an independent and simple theme appeals to our aesthetic feeling with that directness, which tolerates no explanation, except, perhaps, that of its inherent fitness and the harmony of parts, to the exclusion of any alien factor. It pleases for its own sake, like an arabesque, a column, or some spontaneous product of nature – a leaf or a flower.”

Chapter 4: Analysis of the Subjective Impression of Music

He distinguishes between the composer, musical work as an autonomous object, and the activity of the listener. When discussing the initial compositional conception he cites women as an example for why this process cannot be emotional, but must be intellectual. He writes, “Women by nature are highly emotional beings, [but] have achieved nothing as composers.” He acknowledges that composers do possess a highly developed emotional faculty but that in music it is not the “productive factor.” Furthermore, he asserts, “It is not the actual feeling of the composer” that evokes feelings in a listener, but “the purely musical features of a composition.” Regarding the listener, he includes a lengthy discussion of the science of hearing and its limitations. He concludes, “Those theorists who ground the beautiful in music on the feelings it excites build upon a most uncertain foundation, scientifically speaking, since they are necessarily quite ignorant of the nature of this connection, and can therefore, at best, only indulge in speculations and flights of fancy. An interpretation of music based on the feelings cannot be acceptable either to art or science.”

Chapter 5: An Aesthetic Hearing as Distinguished from a Pathological Hearing of Music

He identifies two modes of listening: active (“aesthetic”) and passive (“pathological”). The active listener listens to music to discover the method of composition, while to the passive listener music is merely sound. He writes, 
 
“The most important factor in the mental process which accompanies the act of listening to music, and which converts it into a source of pleasure, is frequently overlooked. We here refer to the intellectual satisfaction which the listener derives from continually following and anticipating the composer’s intentions – now, to see his expectations fulfilled, and now, to find himself agreeably mistaken. It is a matter of course that this intellectual flux and reflux, this perpetual giving and receiving takes place unconsciously, and with the rapidity of lightning flashes. Only that music can yield truly aesthetic enjoyment which prompts and rewards the act of thus closely following the composer’s thoughts, and which with perfect justice may be called a pondering of the imagination.”

Chapter 6: Music in its Relation to Nature

Hanslick suggests, “Melody is the ‘initial force,’ the life-blood, the primitive cell of the musical organism, with which the drift and development of the composition are closely bound up”; both melody and harmony are “achievement[s] of man.” Rhythm, however, and in particular duple meter, he believes is found in nature: “It is the only musical element which nature possesses, the first we are conscious of, and that with which the mind of the infant and the savage becomes soonest familiar.” He continues to posit that music is a product of the mind, having no precursor in nature. Even the music of a shepherd is not natural, he claims, since it was invented in the shepherd's mind, and the imitation of cuckoos in symphonies, for example, should not be considered music, since its function is not musical but poetic (i.e., to point to something outside of the music).

Chapter 7: Form and Substance (Subject) as Applied to Music

Hanslick concludes that the idea in music can only be purely musical (“Music consists of successions and forms of sound, and these alone constitute the subject”), and the value of a piece of music is determined by the relation between the idea (for example the theme) and the whole of the work. He writes,  
 
“We cannot acquaint anybody with the ‘subject’ of a theme, except by playing it. The subject of a composition can, therefore, not be understood as an object derived from an external source, but as something intrinsically musical; in other words, as the concrete group of sounds in a piece of music. Now, as a composition must comply with the formal laws of beauty, it cannot run on arbitrarily and at random, but must develop gradually with intelligible and organic definiteness, as buds develop into rich blossoms.”

Works (German editions) 
 Eduard Hanslick, "Vom Musikalisch-Schönen". Leipzig 1854 (online version)
 Eduard Hanslick, "Geschichte des Konzertwesens in Wien", 2 vol. Vienna 1869–70
 Eduard Hanslick, "Die moderne Oper", 9 vol. Berlin 1875–1900
 Eduard Hanslick, "Aus meinem Leben", 2 vol. Berlin 1894
 Eduard Hanslick, "Suite. Aufsätze über Musik und Musiker". Vienna 1884

Compositions 
 Milostná píseň pod Vyšehradem (Love song beneath Vyšehrad) for violin and piano, op.9

See also
 Aesthetics of music

References

Notes

Citations

Sources

Further reading
See  for an extensive bibliography
 Ambros Wilhelmer, "Der junge Hanslick. Sein 'Intermezzo' in Klagenfurt 1850-1852". Klagenfurt 1959
 Ludvová, Jitka. Dokonalý antiwagnerián Eduard Hanslick. Paměti/Fejetony/Kritiky (Praha 1992).
 
 Eduard Hanslick, "Censur und Kunst-Kritik," Wiener Zeitung, 24 March 1848, republished in his Sämtliche Schriften, vol 1, part 1, p. 157, Ed. Dietmar Strauß
 Christian Jung: Wagner und Hanslick. Kurze Geschichte einer Feindschaft. In: Österreichische Musikzeitschrift 67 (2012), p.. 14–21.
 Nicole Grimes et al., ed., Rethinking Hanslick: Music, Formalism, and Expression, University of Rochester Press, 2013

External links

 
 
 
 Geoffrey Payzant and Eduard Hanslick collection at University of Toronto Music Library
 Eduard Hanslick, Internet Encyclopedia of Philosophy

Austrian music critics
Austrian musicologists
Austrian music journalists
Charles University alumni
German Bohemian people
Austrian people of German Bohemian descent
Czech Jews
Classical music critics
Writers from Prague
1825 births
1904 deaths
Wagner scholars
Burials at the Vienna Central Cemetery
Academic staff of the University of Vienna
19th-century musicologists